André Lefèvre (4 May 1718 – 25 February 1768) was an 18th-century French jurist and man of letters. A lawyer from 1739, Lefèvre wrote poetry and essays. He went to Paris and became tutor to the children of large families, especially the descendants of the house of Rochefoucauld.

He contributed the articles « gouverneur », « faiblesse », « folie » and « gouvernante », to the Encyclopédie by Diderot and d'Alembert

Works 
1744: Mémoires de l’Académie des sciences de Troyes en Champagne. Liège 
1748: Pot-Pourri. 
1767: Dialogue entre un curé et son filleul.

Sources 
 Pierre Larousse, Grand Dictionnaire universel du XIXe, vol. 10, Paris, Administration du grand Dictionnaire universel, (p. 1477).
 John Lough, The Encyclopédie. Slatkine, Geneva (1971)(p. 51)

References

External links 
 André Lefèvre on data.bnf.fr
 André Lefèvre on Wikisource

18th-century French lawyers
18th-century French male writers
18th-century French poets
Contributors to the Encyclopédie (1751–1772)
1717 births
People from Troyes
1768 deaths